G. V. Montgomery Airport  is a city-owned, public-use airport located one nautical mile (2 km) south of the central business district of Forest, a city in Scott County, Mississippi, United States. It is included in the National Plan of Integrated Airport Systems for 2011–2015, which categorized it as a general aviation facility.

Facilities and aircraft 
G. V. Montgomery Airport covers an area of 87 acres (35 ha) at an elevation of 517 feet (158 m) above mean sea level. It has one runway designated 16/34 with an asphalt surface measuring 3,600 by 75 feet (1,097 x 23 m).

For the 12-month period ending April 5, 2012, the airport had 5,460 general aviation aircraft operations, an average of 14 per day. At that time there were two single-engine aircraft based at this airport.

References

External links 
 Aerial image as of January 1996 from USGS The National Map
 

Airports in Mississippi
Scott County, Mississippi